The R190 road is a regional road in Ireland which links Cootehill in County Cavan and Ballybay in County Monaghan.

See also 

 Roads in Ireland
 National primary road
 National secondary road

References 

Regional roads in the Republic of Ireland

Roads in County Monaghan
Roads in County Cavan